Menucha veSimcha is a piyyut which Ashkenazic Jews traditionally sing on Sabbath eve. The piyyut is acrostically signed "MoSHE", and some attribute it to Moses ben Qalonymus. 

The theme of the piyyut is praise of the Sabbath. The payyetan praises those who properly observe the Sabbath, whose acts attest to God's six-day creation of the world. The piyyut mentions various Sabbath obligations and practices, and the reward which comes to those who keep them.

Words

References

Jewish liturgical poems
Zemirot